The Biggest Loser is an Australian reality television show, based on the original American version of the same name. It is produced by Shine Australia and screened on Network Ten. Since 2015, the show has been hosted by former contestant Fiona Falkiner, It was formerly hosted by Ajay Rochester from 2006 to 2009 & former Olympian Hayley Lewis from 2010 to 2014. The show debuted on 13 February 2006, followed by a second season on 4 February 2007 which introduced Michelle Bridges, Shannan Ponton and Steve Willis. The third season began airing on 3 February 2008. A fourth season, which features couples competing as teams, started airing on 1 February 2009. A fifth season, which aired on 31 January 2010, featuring former Olympic swimmer Hayley Lewis as the new host, and in 2011 the show introduced the new trainer Tiffiny Hall. In its eleventh season, the show introduced new trainer Libby Babet. The show did not return in 2018 due to low ratings.

About the series
The series involves contestants who are overweight to varying degrees participating in a contest to lose the most percentage of weight, with teams and contestants voting out each other. Unlike the American version, weight loss is measured in tenths of kilograms instead of pounds.

Personal trainers Michelle Bridges, Shannan Ponton, Steve Willis and Tiffiny Hall are responsible for training the contestants and helping them to lose weight. Michelle and Shannan have been the main trainers since Season 2 (in Season 1 the original American trainers Bob Harper and Jillian Michaels were used, and in Seasons 2 and 3 they appeared as guests).

Seasons one to three of the show were filmed in Terrey Hills, one of the northern suburbs of Sydney. The Walk was filmed at Bobbin Head in Ku-ring-gai Chase National Park, Turramurra, New South Wales.

Season 4 began filming at Fitzroy Island in Far North Queensland, before moving to North Head, Sydney.

Series Overview

Winners

Hosts & Trainers

Season Guide

Season 1 (2006)

This is an Australian version of the program first aired at 7.00pm each weeknight on Network Ten from 13 February, to the final episode on 27 April 2006 where the first Australia's Biggest Loser was awarded A$200,000. The program, directed by Ian Stevenson, featured the same personal trainers as the US version, Bob Harper and Jillian Michaels with Australian host Ajay Rochester. Over 6,000 Australians applied to take part, only 12 contestants being chosen to compete, their starting weight ranging from 101 kg (Fiona) to 196 kg (David).

Season 2 (2007)

The second season of the Australian version first went to air on Sunday 4 February 2007 on the Ten Network, the eventual winner being Chris Garling who lost 70.1 kg and won A$200,000. It was introduced with personal trainers Bob Harper and Jillian Michaels, who were then taken over by two new Australian trainers, Michelle Bridges and Shannan Ponton, with one extra surprise trainer, "Commando" Steve Willis. The contestants starting weights range from 108 kg (Mel) to 216 kg (Damien). The beginning of this series marked some controversy with a contestant quitting, two leaving on medical terms and the introduction of "The Walk" which gave individual immunity winners unprecedented power as to how the game is played. The latest twist in the game was revealed on 21 March 2007, where it was revealed to the competitors and viewers that there was a secret weigh-in involving two "outsiders" on the first day. These outsiders (Chris and Kimberlie) had trained daily with the "Commando" whilst still living at home and going about their everyday lives. Their entry into the house caused some upset, especially with newcomer Chris recording a big enough weight loss to see him enter the competition as the 3rd biggest loser, and eventually going on to become the season's winner.

Season 3 (2008)

The third season premiered on 3 February 2008 in a similar format as the previous two seasons, with the winner receiving A$200,000. The three Australian trainers from previous seasons return in addition to Bob Harper and Jillian Michaels, who trained a rival team in the United States. The starting weights ranged from 111 kg (Carrianne) to 206 kg (Garry).

Applications for the third season opened at the end of season 2.

On 1 May, university student Sam Rouen became the show's youngest Biggest Loser.

Season 4 (2009)

On 24 June 2008, it was announced on the official website that there would be a fourth season of the show, The Biggest Loser Australia: Couples.

After complaints from neighbours "The Biggest Loser" was kicked out of the house known as the White House in Duffy's Forest, near Mona Vale. Neighbours complained to the council of smells coming from the property, even though they only use the property for around 4 months.

Filming for Season 4 of The Biggest Loser Australia took place on Fitzroy Island off the coast of Far North Queensland and in Sydney.

The fourth season premiered on 1 February 2009. It featured ten couples who all have some kind of relationship and are overweight, their weights ranged from 102 kg (Mel) to 178 kg (Sharif). Each couple competed against the other couples, temporarily replacing the regular format of two teams of individuals.

On 27 April, Bob Herdsman, at 57 years old, with a record weight loss of 87.6 kilograms (52.2%), became the show's oldest Biggest Loser.

On 16 May it was revealed that the 2009 season of the Biggest Loser was the last to feature host Ajay Rochester.

Season 5 (2010)

Biggest Loser Season 5 was the second series to feature couples. Applications opened after the fourth season aired, and filming started at its regular time in mid-January. Hayley Lewis hosted season 5, replacing Ajay Rochester. Trainers Michelle Bridges, Shannan Ponton and Steve Willis returned for this season. Season 5 began on Sunday 31 January 2010 at 6:30pm on Ten.

Deryck James Ward and his sister left the show under a cloud when he was charged with child pornography offences. All references to the couple were hastily edited out before the show aired. Ward was subsequently jailed for two years.

The original grand prize amount was $200,000, with the possibility of being doubled to $400,000 by the Double bracelet. However, Chris Galea took $15,000 out of the grand prize amount by leaving the game during Temptation in Week 6.

On 18 April 2010, Lisa Hose was crowned with The Biggest Loser 2010. Earning the grand prize of $185,000, but due to the double bracelet she was wearing, this prize money increased to $370,000. She is also the first female winner of The Biggest Loser.

Season 6 (2011)

The sixth season of the series, The Biggest Loser Australia: Families, began airing on 30 January 2011.
Host Hayley Lewis announced during the Series 5 finale that they were taking applications for the sixth season of the series and that it would be family contestants, Teams of four family members compete for the title of the Biggest Loser in this round. The teams are the Westrens, the Challenors, the Duncans and the Moons. Emma Duncan was crowned the Biggest Loser 2011, with a total weight loss of 62.1 kg (46.38%). Sharlene Westren took The Eliminated Contestants prize of $20,000. The Westren Family won the title of the Biggest Losing Family. Emma and the Westrens won $100,000.

Season 7 (2012)

The seventh season of the series, The Biggest Loser Australia: Singles, began airing on 23 January 2012. During Network Ten's 2012 Programming Launch on 17 August 2011; it was revealed that the show would be reverting to its original singles format.

The show premiered to rather soft numbers receiving 897,000. However the show was put up against The Big Bang Theory and the Australian Open.

The series was won by Margie Cummins who lost 73.2 kg a total percentage of 46.01% winning $220,000. The original prize pool was $250,000, but $30,000 of this was taken by James Moore in Week 2 by leaving the game during Temptation. Lydia Hantke took home the eliminated contestants prize of $20,000.

Season 8 (2013)

Ten confirmed during August 2012 that The Biggest Loser Australia would return for an eighth season in 2013. Dubbed "The Next Generation", every team will be made up of a parent-child team. Tiffiny Hall is the only trainer not returning. The 2013 season premiered on 17 March and was shown every Sunday, Monday and Tuesday. This season has introduced the heaviest contestant on The Biggest Loser worldwide, Kevin Moore. Kevin weighs 255 kg (562 lbs).

The show was won by Robyn and Katie Dyke.

Season 9 (2014)

It was confirmed during the season eight finale that The Biggest Loser would return for a ninth season titled 'The Biggest Loser: Challenge Australia'. The 2014 season started on 19 January.
The show was won by Craig Booby.

Season 10 (2015) 

In April 2015, it was confirmed that The Biggest Loser would return in late 2015, with season 10 to be titled TBL Families, with former contestant Fiona Falkiner taking over as host from Hayley Lewis. In addition, Bridges, Ponton, Willis and Hall were announced to all return as trainers. The season premiered on 13 September 2015. Daniel Jofre was crowned Biggest Loser, which saw him awarded $100,000, In addition, the Jofre family received $100,000 for being the family to lose the most weight.

Season 11 (2017) 

The season, titled "The Biggest Loser: Transformed", premiered on 14 March 2017, Shannon Ponton returned as a trainer, along with new trainer Libby Babet, with previous trainers Michelle Bridges, Steve "Commando" Willis, and Tiffany Hall not returning. Fiona Falkiner returned as the host.

Music
The music used in the second season's promotional advertising is an original score from Downright Music, Session 5 – Premiere Song Sampler called 'A long way to go'
The music used in the third season's promotional cinema, TV and radio advertising is Everybody's Gotta Learn Sometime by Robyn Loau.
The music used in the fourth season's promotional advertising is 'Fighter' by Christina Aguilera.
The music used in the promotional advertising and the opening and end credits for the first five seasons of the show is 'Lift' by Shannon Noll.
The music used in the eighth season's promotional advertising is 'Try' by Pink.
The music used in the ninth season's promotional advertising is 'Roar' by Katy Perry.

Soundtrack
The Official soundtrack for the TV series was released on 17 March 2007 featuring various artists such as Kelly Clarkson, Fatboy Slim, The Black Eyed Peas, and Shakira.

Track listing
Shannon Noll – Lift
The Black Eyed Peas – Pump It
Rogue Traders – Way To Go!
Kelly Clarkson – Walk Away
BodyRockers – I Like the Way (You Move) (radio Edit)
Britney Spears – Do Somethin'
Pink – U + Ur Hand (clean)
Charlotte Church – Crazy Chick
The Killers – Somebody Told Me
Gretchen Wilson – Redneck Woman
Groove Armada – I See You Baby
Pussycat Dolls – Don't Cha
Shakira – Hips Don't Lie (featuring Wyclef Jean)
Anastacia – Sick & Tired (jason Nevins Electrochill Remix Edit)
INXS – Pretty Vegas
Will Smith – Switch
Fergie – London Bridge
Planet Funk – The Switch
Fatboy Slim – The Rockafeller Skank
Christina Aguilera – Fighter
Sister Sledge – We are Family (opening credits)

Book
The Biggest Loser: Change Your Life is a paperback book published by Hardie Grant Trade on 1 March 2007 and offers exercises, healthy diets and eating plans based on those used by the contestants. The book also includes motivational advice from the second season trainers, Shannon Ponton and Michelle Bridges, and suggestions from former season one contestants.

The book has three chapters: Ready, gives a summary of exercises and diets. Set, has over 60 healthy recipes and further detail about exercises. Go . The exercise plans covered include a two-week "KickStart Plan" and a three-month "LifeStyle Program" .

See also
List of The Biggest Loser Australia episodes
List of Australian television series
Excess Baggage
BIG - Extreme Makeover

References

External links
Official Network Ten Site: The Biggest Loser (Australia)
 

Australian
Network 10 original programming
2000s Australian reality television series
2006 Australian television series debuts
2010s Australian reality television series
Television shows set in New South Wales
Television shows set in Queensland
Television series by Fremantle (company)
English-language television shows
Television shows set in Victoria (Australia)
Australian television series based on American television series